The , signed as Route K2, is one of the tolled routes of the Shuto Expressway system serving the Greater Tokyo Area and is one of seven of the routes in the system serving Kanagawa Prefecture. It serves as a radial route running west from central Yokohama.

Route description
The Mitsuzawa Route links central Yokohama and the Yokohane Route to the southwestern suburbs of Tokyo, primarily Setagaya, by way of the Daisan Keihin Road. Route K2 begins at Kinkō Junction in Nishi-ku traveling west from the Yokohane Route. From this eastern terminus, it travels west through the northern limits of the ward, curving slightly to the northwest. It passes beneath Mitsuzawa Park near NHK Spring Mitsuzawa Football Stadium where it crosses in to Kanagawa-ku where it has a junction with Kanagawa Prefecture Route 13. Next it enters  Hodogaya-ku. In this ward Route K2 meets its western terminus at Mitsuzawa Junction where it transitions into the Daisan Keihin Road with access also to the Yokohama Shindō.

The speed limit along almost the entirety of the Mitsuzawa Route is set at 60 km/h.

History
The first section of the Mitsuzawa Route was opened to traffic on 7 August 1972. The second a final section of the expressway to be opened was a segment that is located between the interchange at Yokohama-eki-nishiguchi and the route's western terminus at Mitsuzawa Junction. It was opened on 7 March 1978, completing the expressway.

Junction list
The entire expressway lies within Yokohama in Kanagawa Prefecture.

See also

References

External links

K1
1972 establishments in Japan
Roads in Kanagawa Prefecture